KND may refer to:

Organisations
 KND Corporation, operator of radio station WKND, Windsor, Connecticut, US
 Democratic National Katarism, political party of Fernando Untoja Choque, Bolivia
 Kan Air (ICAO: KND), airline, Thailand
 Kindred Healthcare (NYSE: KND), US

Places
 Kanda Station (Tokyo), JR East station code
 Kindu Airport (IATA: KND), Kindu, Democratic Republic of the Congo
 Niederdollendorf station (DS100, KND), Königswinter, Germany

Other
 Codename: Kids Next Door, US TV cartoon series